Keken-Vasilyevka (Käkän-Vasilyevka) is a rural locality (a selo) in Kozhay-Semyonovsky Selsoviet, Miyakinsky District, Bashkortostan, Russia. The population was 303 as of 2010. There are 2 streets.

Geography 
Keken-Vasilyevka is located 14 km northwest of Kirgiz-Miyaki (the district's administrative centre) by road. Chayka is the nearest rural locality.

References 

Rural localities in Miyakinsky District